Echinus or Echinos was an ancient Greek town of Acarnania. Legend has it that it was founded by a Greek mythological figure named Echinus. It is mentioned by the poet Rhianus, and appears in the list of cities of Acarnania transmitted by Pliny the Elder, who places it between Heraclea and Actium. The site of Echinus is near the modern town of Vonitsa, probably the kastro (or castle) of Profitis Elias.

See also
List of cities in ancient Epirus

References

Sources

Populated places in ancient Acarnania
Cities in ancient Epirus
Former populated places in Greece